Emerald Rose is a Celtic folk rock band from the US state of Georgia. The band consists of four members: Brian Sullivan (Logan), Larry Morris, Arthur Hinds and Clyde Gilbert. Emerald Rose plays a mix of Celtic, folk, and Pagan tunes.

Biography
Brian " Logan" Sullivan, Arthur Hinds, Larry Morris and Clyde Gilbert formed the band Emerald Rose in late 1996. Sharing a common interest in ancient religions, musical styles, fantasy, and Celtic mythology, the four began to explore music as another creative outlet for their combined talents. After a few jam sessions around the campfire, the band performed their first live professional gig on St. Patrick's Day, 1997. Inspired by the energy the four created together on stage and in the studio, Emerald Rose released their first self-titled CD in 1998. Since then, Emerald Rose have released three independently produced CDs: "Bending Tradition" (2000), "Fire in the Head - Emerald Rose Live!" (2002), and "Celtic Crescent" (2003).

Discography

Emerald Rose (1998)
 Star of the County Down 	  	 
 Summerland 	  	 
 Maggie Lauder 	  	 
 Around the World for Sport/The Otter's Nest 	  	 
 The World's Wedding (One Single Kiss) 	  	 
 Never Underestimate... 	  	 
 My PBJ 	  	 
 Donald MacGillivray 	  	 
 Scatter the Mud/Tar Road to Sligo/Paddy Clancy's 	  	 
 Padstow 	  	 
 Dagger of the Moon 	  	 
 A Pict Song 	  	 
 Bring Me Home

Bending Tradition (2000)
 Penny In The Well
 Fire In The Head
 Lucky Man
 Jigs:Green Hills of Garland/The Gallagher Lass/The Ferret's Nose
 Red-Haired Mary
 Pagan Girl
 Come By The Hills
 Merry May Folk
 Johnnie Cope
 Castle of Arianrhod
 Freya, Shakti
 Unfinished Business
 Hills of America

Fire in the Head (2002)
 Star of the County Down 	  	 
 Fire in the Head 	  	 
 World's Wedding 	  	 
 Drowsy Maggie/Morning Invention/Green Groves of Erin 	  	 
 Merry May Folk 	  	 
 A Pict Song 	  	 
 Vampire Girl from Orn 	  	 
 Summerland 	  	 
 Call Me Home 	  	 
 Never Underestimate 	  	 
 Chicken Raid of Cymru 	  	 
 Freya, Shakti 	  	 
 Donald McGillivray

Celtic Crescent (2003)
 Drowsy Maggie/Morning Invention/Green Groves of Erin 	  	 
 Loch Lomond 	  	 
 World's Wedding 	  	 
 Green Hills of Garland/Gallagher Lass/Ferret's Nose 	  	 
 Wild Mountain Thyme 	  	 
 Round the World for Sport/The Otter's Nest 	  	 
 Fire In The Head 	  	 
 Hills of America 	  	 
 Scatter the Mud/Tar Road to Sligo/Paddy Clancy's 	  	 
 Star of the County Down 	  	 
 Call Me Home 	  	 
 Maggie Lauder 	  	 
 Unfinished Business 	  	 
 Donald McGillivray

Songs for the Night Sky (2004)
 Urania Sings
 Take Me Down (To Her Water)
 Gwydion's Song to Lleu
 Come to the Dance
 World's Wedding
 Penny in the Well
 Pipes Set
 Fire in the Head

Archives of Ages to Come (2005)
 Come to the Dance
 Before the Twilight Falls
 Take Me Down
 Four Doors to Elfland
 Queen of Argyll
 Three More Drops
 Autumn in Asheville
 Gwydion's Song To Lleu
 Wheel of Fortune
 Four Jacks
 Irish Heartbeat
 Dagger of the Moon
 Urania Sings
 Whistler's Farewell
 Dance of the Rats
 We Come From Monkeys

Con Suite (2007)
 Chocolate Frog
 No Booze Today
 Tree Huggin Man
 Fairies Stole My Keys
 All for Me Grog
 Bronya Vladivoshtnocht!
 Never Split the Party
 Vulcan Rubdown
 Big Damn Heroes
 Danny in the Jar
 Solitary Motel
 Vampire Girl from Orn

That Night in the Garden (2009)
 Four Jacks
 Penny in the Well
 Autumn in Asheville
 Caledonia
 Red Haired Mary
 Wild Mountain Thyme
Johnny Cope
 Twilight Falls
 Come to the Dance
 Take Me Down
 Tree Hugging Man
 Maggie Lauder
 Merry Mayfolk
 Blue Mountain Rue
 Castle of Arianrhod
 Drowsy Maggie
 Gallant Murray
 Donald McGillivray

Verdant (2011)
 Her Majesty's Airship Corps
 She Moves Through the Fair
 In the Mixdown
 Omega
 Clockwork Love
 Sunny Day
 Castaway
 The Salamanca/The Sailor's Bonnet
 Shepherdess of Dreams
 The Empty Isle (Blasket Song)
The Wind That Shakes the Barley
 The Peat That Smokes the Barley
 Freya, Shakti

Sunwise (2016) 

 Ancient Days
 Dance til the Moon Goes Down
 Rage of the Butterfly
 Mountain Fey
 Land of the Dancing Trees
 Morrison's Jig/The Silver Spear
 Padstow
 Unwind
 Call Me Home
 The Wild Hunt
 Drombeg

Four Fat Dads (2016) 

 Chocolate Frog (Dragon Con 2007) [Live]
 Danny in the Jar (Dragon Con 2008) [Live]
 Green Hills of Garland, The Gallagher Lass, The Ferret's Nose (Folkways Center 2003) [Live]
 Penny in the Well (Dragon Con 2007) [Live]
 The Chicken Raid of Cymru (Demented Cut) [Dragon Con 2008] [Live]\
 Merry Mayfolk (Dragon Con 2007) [Live]
 Goth Baby (Rants and Rambles 2002)
 Fairies Stole My Keys (Dragon Con 2008) [Live]
 Hills of America (Folkways Center 2003) [Live]
 Around the World for Sport, The Otter's Nest (Folkways Center 2003) [Live]
 Red Haired Mary (Dragon Con 2008) [Live]
 Santa Claus Is Pagan Too (Big Choir Mix) [Unearthed 2010]
 Vampire Girl (Dragon Con 2008) [Live]
 Ever Increasing Jigs (Folkways Center 2003) [Live]
 Unfinished Business (Folkways Center 2003) [Live]
 Urania Sings (Dragon Con 2008) [Live]
 Clockwork Love (Big Instrumental Mix) [Unearthed 2010]

Personnel
Brian Sullivan (Logan) - Vocals, lead acoustic/electric guitar, mandola
Larry Morris - Vocals, pennywhistle, uilleann pipes, Percussion
Arthur Hinds - Vocals, rhythm guitar, bodhrán, percussion
Clyde Gilbert - Vocals, electric bass, percussion

References

External links
Official website
Emerald Rose on Myspace

1996 establishments in Georgia (U.S. state)
American folk rock groups
Celtic music groups
Musical groups established in 1996
Musical groups from Georgia (U.S. state)